The following is a list of bays of the Houston area.

Bays
  Black Duck Bay
  Burnett Bay 
  Crystal Bay
 Galveston Bay
 Lower San Jacinto Bay
 Mitchell Bay
 Scott Bay
 Tabbs Bay
 Upper San Jacinto Bay

Houston
Houston
Bays
Bays